The White Factory is the classicist building in Łódź, Poland, constructed in 1835–1839 to host a textile factory which belonged to Ludwik Geyer. It currently hosts the Central Museum of Textiles and Folk Dance Ensemble "HARNAM". It is considered a fine example of early industrial architecture in Łódź. The building is located at the southern end of Piotrkowska Street, south of the city center.

In the first half of the 19th century Łódź, which was a part of the Congress Poland and previously a small town, experienced a rapid economic and industrial development. The city was open for migrants, and Geyer, a German originally from Saxony, moved to the city to start textile production. The building was reconstructed several times after the 1830s but still retains its original plan. In 1955, the decision was taken to host the Central Museum of Textiles in the building, and in 1958 the reconstruction works which made the building usable as a museum started. The museum was established as an independent institution in 1960. Simultaneously, the building was still exploited as a factory until 1990, when the production in the eastern wing stopped. The wing was transferred to the museum in the 2002, completing the transfer of the whole complex.

White Factory is a four-wing building with a courtyard. The oldest wing is the western one, facing Piotrkowska Street. The northern wing is from 1838, the southern one is from 1847, and the eastern wing was built in 1886. In the courtyard, the Old Boiler House is constructed. The complex has a high chimney, two dust towers, and two water towers, which is an unusual solution for the first half of the 19th century. South of the building, a pond is made. Next to the White Factory, still on industrial grounds, the Open Air Museum of Łódź Timber Architecture was opened in 2009.

The building was classified as a cultural heritage monument.

References

Buildings and structures in Łódź